Kevin Wilson is a game designer who has worked primarily on board games and role-playing games.

Early life and education
Wilson received a B.A. in Cognitive Science (Artificial Intelligence) from U.C. Berkeley in 1997, and was active in the interactive fiction community at the time. He wrote several works of interactive fiction — including Once and Future and The Lesson of the Tortoise — and founded the annual Interactive Fiction Competition and the Internet magazine SPAG.

Career
Kevin Wilson has been a game designer since the late 1990s. Wilson co-designed Alderac Entertainment Group's second role-playing game, 7th Sea (1998), with Jennifer Wick and John Wick. Wilson wrote the adventure Wonders Out of Time (2001), the sequel to Akrasia: Thief of Time (2001) from Eden Studios's "Eden Odyssey" series of adventures. Wilson is the co-designer of the Spycraft roleplaying game. As Fantasy Flight Games's d20 System success grew, they hired Wilson to oversee a retooling of the Legends & Lairs line, and he split it into a number of smaller sublines filled with smaller sourcebooks. The wargame, A Game of Thrones (2003) by Christian T. Petersen and Wilson, was one of several games published by Fantasy Flight in the American style while the company had been republishing eurogames. Wilson is the author of the RPG book Spellslinger. Petersen and Wilson created a gaming system for Doom: The Boardgame (2004), which was later revised and used in Descent: Journeys in the Dark (2006). Wilson also designed World of Warcraft: The Board Game (2005), as well as Arkham Horror second edition (with Richard Launius). He also designed Sid Meier's Civilization: The Board Game (2010).

Wilson lives near the Twin Cities.

References

External links
 Home page
 Kevin Wilson :: Pen & Paper RPG Database archive

Board game designers
Living people
Role-playing game designers
Year of birth missing (living people)